Karachi Film Society (KFS), is a non-profit film presentation organization based in Karachi, Pakistan. Founded in 2017 by Hum TV Network Limited president Sultana Siddiqui - the film society spotlights Pakistani cinema, world cinema and recognizes and supports new filmmakers by providing access through its workshops, seminars and festivals.

The Karachi Film Society also hosts the inaugural and would be annual Pakistan International Film Festival (PIFF).

Winners and nominees
The society later started a film festival known as Pakistan International Film Festival in  March 2018.
The Pakistan International Film Festival (PIFF) aims to be the largest film
festival in Pakistan. PIFF will screen features, shorts and documentaries
from Pakistan and around the world. Its mission is to create a unique platform which promotes both
Pakistani cinema and Pakistani filmmakers by showcasing their films to diverse international audiences. We
also plan to bring international filmmakers and their work to Pakistan to create an interactive space for
exchange of ideas and for open dialogue. PIFF will provide opportunities to encourage co-productions and to portray Pakistan as an exciting and vibrant country, with great cinematic potential.
At the last day of the ceremony awards were given
Below is the list of winners and nominations

Winners and nominees

References

External links
 

Film organisations in Pakistan
Film societies
Organisations based in Karachi